Edward Raban may refer to:

Edward Raban (printer) (died 1658) English printer associated with Aberdeen, Scotland
Edward Raban (British Army officer) (1850–1927) British Army officer in the Royal Engineers